Drepano (Greek: Δρέπανο) may refer to the following places in Greece:

Drepano, Argolis a place in Argolis
Drepano, Achaea, village in the municipality of Patras, Achaia
Drepano, Kozani, a place in the Kozani regional unit